NBC Nightside (also known as NBC News Nightside) is an American overnight news broadcasting program on NBC, that aired from 1991 to 1998. The program was produced in three half-hour segments. It usually aired live seven nights a week, and was fed to NBC stations beginning at 2:00 am ET Sunday through Friday (immediately following Later) and 2:30 am ET on Saturdays (after Friday Night Videos), and looped until the next morning. (NBC News at Sunrise   followed Nightside on weekdays.)

History
The program premiered on November 4, 1991, and was NBC's second attempt at a late night news program after NBC News Overnight, which ran for seventeen months from 1982 to 1983.

Nightside differed from its two competitors – CBS' Up to the Minute and ABC's World News Now, which are both based in New York City – in that rather than being broadcast from the headquarters of NBC News itself in New York, it was instead based out of the Charlotte, North Carolina facilities of NBC News Channel, the network's newsfeed service providing customized reports and video of national news to NBC's owned-and-operated stations and network affiliates, and which was based in studios connected to those of Charlotte's NBC affiliate WCNC-TV. Also unlike the other network overnight newscasts, which run only on Monday through Fridays, NBC Nightside ran in the early morning hours on all seven days of the week.

Some of Nightsides many anchors went on to national success including Antonio Mora and Campbell Brown. Former NBC News president Steve Capus once served as a senior producer for the program.

Despite financial profitability of the show and decent ratings, it was canceled by the network in 1998 and aired its last telecast on September 20 of that year, with NBC filling the overnight timeslot beginning two days later with NBC All Night, a block consisting of repeats of the network's late night and daytime talk shows. Since then, most NBC stations  run either paid programming, Early Today or local morning newscasts in the former NBC Nightside slot. The network has not had a late night newscast since Nightside's cancellation.

Anchors
The program's anchors included:
Campbell Brown
Tom Donovan
Bruce Hall
Sara James
Kim Hindrew
Hilary Lane
Antonio Mora
Tom Miller
Tonya Strong

References

NBC original programming
American late-night television shows
1991 American television series debuts
1998 American television series endings
1990s American television news shows
NBC News
NBC late-night programming